CISA-DT (channel 7) is a television station in Lethbridge, Alberta, Canada, part of the Global Television Network. Owned and operated by network parent Corus Entertainment, the station maintains studios inside the Royal Bank building at the corner of 7 Street South and 4 Avenue South in Downtown Lethbridge, and its transmitter is located near Highway 25 and Range Road 221, just outside the city.

The station carries the full Global network schedule, and its programming is similar to sister station CICT-DT in Calgary. It is the smallest station in the Global network (formerly second to the defunct Shaw-owned affiliate CJBN-TV in Kenora, Ontario) and is the only standalone commercial station in Southern Alberta.

History

As CJLH-TV
The station first signed on the air on November 20, 1955 as CJLH-TV, broadcasting on VHF channel 7 from a 167,000-watt transmitter atop a  tower located at what was the city limits of Lethbridge. The station was a joint venture between local radio station CJOC (the "CJ" in the call sign) and the Lethbridge Herald (the "LH"). It was managed by CJOC's owners, Taylor Pearson & Carson, and began life as an affiliate of the Canadian Broadcasting Corporation's (CBC) television network. Network programs on kinescope arrived within a few days to a week after they went to air live in Toronto, Montreal, Vancouver, or the U.S. networks. Three months after CJLH went to air, measurement services showed that the station had a potential audience of 9,400 homes, but within a year, that grew to 19,200, and of those, 16,000 had bought television sets. At the time, CJLH was the only station in the Lethbridge area.

Local programming at the time included local newscasts; Channel 7 Spotlight, showcasing area talent; Remember When, a series of programs hosted by Harry Baalim using slides, pictures and relics to tell the history of Southern Alberta; and Home Gardener, featuring many experts in the field demonstrating proper horticultural technique. These programs (along with several others) earned the station many awards, including seven awards from Liberty magazine in the 1950s and 1960s.

In 1958, the timeshifting problems the station had with network programming were eliminated when it was able to get a direct microwave link to the CBC network via its Calgary time-delay centre. The problem still existed for live sports events, such as NHL hockey and CFL football telecasts. In 1961, CJLH expanded into the Crowsnest Pass area, by opening a repeater station at Burmis on channel 3. An application from CFCN-TV in Calgary to open a repeater station in Lethbridge was unsuccessful in getting CRTC approval that year.

However, a year later in 1968, an agreement was reached between CFCN and CJLH to share space on the CJLH tower and building for technical equipment. On September 3, CFCN went on the air with a repeater station on channel 13. That same year, the station's first 2-inch black and white videotape recorder was installed, and a repeater in Brooks began operations, transmitting at low power on VHF channel 3.

As CJOC-TV
In 1970, program production was increased significantly when CJLH became a two-camera operation. Two years later, the Herald sold its stake in the station to Selkirk Communications (as Taylor Pearson & Carson had been renamed in 1959), who changed its call sign to CJOC-TV to match the radio station.  It became a semi-satellite of co-owned CFAC-TV in Calgary (now CICT-DT) and continued local production with shows such as Time Out, Ski Reports, Our Town, Sunday Hour, Thought for the Day, Focus on University, College Campus and numerous specials. In 1974, CJOC went full colour with two colour cameras and three colour 1" VTRs. CFCN moved out of the CJOC building and into its own during that same year.

As CFAC-TV-7
On September 1, 1975, CFAC-TV disaffiliated from the CBC and became an independent station when CBC Television put its own station, CBRT (channel 9), on the air. On the same day, CJOC also disaffiliated from the CBC as CBRT had set up a rebroadcaster in Lethbridge. In 1976, it changed its callsign to CFAC-TV-7. Despite its rebroadcaster-like callsign, it was still licensed as a full-fledged station. The station took on the same branding as CFAC-TV in Calgary, adopting the moniker "2&7 Lethbridge Television". In 1979, the station increased its transmitter power to 167,000 watts. In 1988, it added a satellite dish to get video news feeds from Global Television, and also began carrying some of Global's entertainment programming along with its Calgary sister.

Local programming continued to play an important role at the station, with successful shows such as Ski West, which was syndicated to CHCH-TV Hamilton, BCTV Vancouver and CFCF-TV Montreal, and was also judged best syndicated show in the country at the time; We Won't Let Him Die, which won the CanPro Founders award in 1983; and Kids Belong Together (1990) and Key to Literacy (1992), both shows won the Canadian Association of Broadcasters Gold Ribbon Award for community involvement.

As CISA-TV

In 1989, Selkirk Communications merged with CFCN's then-owner, Maclean Hunter, who immediately sold most of Selkirk's television holdings, including CFAC-TV-7, to Western International Communications. One year later, WIC changed the station's calls to the current CISA-TV. Through the years, CISA's commitment to local programming has continued to reap both industry awards, making it one of the country's most awarded stations, and audience numbers in its local area.

In 1998, the Griffiths family sold WIC's assets to Shaw Communications and Canwest. In 1999, agreements were lodged with the CRTC to split WIC assets between Canwest, Corus Radio and Shaw. The CRTC approved the purchase in 2001; Western International Communications was sold to Canwest, and CISA-TV became a full-time Global Television Network station under the brand "Global Lethbridge" on September 4 that year. CISA was the last Global station to have its website integrated into the canada.com network.

Programming
Since 1970, CISA's non-news schedule has been identical to that of CICT. Both stations air Global programming on the same schedule as CITV in Edmonton.

News operation
CISA-DT presently broadcasts 7½ hours of locally produced newscasts during the week; in regards to the number of hours devoted to news programming, it is the lowest local newscast output out of Global's news-producing owned-and-operated stations. On September 10, 2008, news production for CISA shifted from Lethbridge to Calgary, with the addition of a new virtual set. In 2015, a new local news production model was launched at CISA, eliminating locally produced weekend newscasts.

Notable former on-air staff
 Jackson Proskow (now as a Washington Bureau Chief reporter for Global News in Washington, D.C.)

Technical information

Subchannel

Analogue-to-digital conversion 
On July 27, 2011, one month before Canadian television stations in CRTC-designated mandatory markets transitioned from analogue to digital broadcasts, the station shut down its Lethbridge analog transmitter and flash cut to digital, becoming the first television station in Southern Alberta to convert to digital. The station's digital signal remained on VHF channel 7.

Transmitters
The following translators will continue to offer the analog signal after CISA's main Lethbridge transmitter is converted to digital.

Alberta translators

Montana translator
CISA-DT has one translator in Montana, which is operated by a local TV association.

References

External links
Global Lethbridge

ISA-DT
ISA-DT
Mass media in Lethbridge
Television channels and stations established in 1955
Corus Entertainment
1955 establishments in Alberta